The following is a list of radio stations in the New Zealand region of Northland, . It includes the frequency, name, owner and transmitter location of each station, its first airdate on that frequency, and previous stations that broadcast on the station. Radio stations in Northland predominantly broadcast from Whangārei, Kaikohe and Kaitaia.

The commercial Northland radio market covers 112 thousand people, from the region's total population of 166 thousand. In a survey of 800 people in 2014, More FM was the most popular station with an estimated 27 thousand listeners and 17.3 percent market share.

Upper Northland

FM stations

AM stations

Lower Northland

FM stations

AM stations

Internet stations 
New Zealand Net Radio, Whangārei.

Low power FM stations

References 

Northland
Radio stations